Buffon is a commune in the Côte-d'Or department in eastern France.

Population

Personalities
 Georges-Louis Leclerc, Comte de Buffon established ironworks there (Forges de Buffon).

See also
Communes of the Côte-d'Or department

References

Communes of Côte-d'Or
Côte-d'Or communes articles needing translation from French Wikipedia